The 2000–01 season was Ulster Rugby's sixth since the advent of professionalism, and their third under coach Harry Williams. They competed in the Heineken Cup and the IRFU Interprovincial Championship. Williams announced in August 2000 that he would leave at the end of the season.

The IRFU rejected a proposal for a Celtic League involving three of the Irish provinces, two Scottish super-districts and seven Welsh clubs, each playing 22 matches. The IRFU argued that the structure proposed would add too many games and leave provincial players unable to play for their clubs, and made a counter-proposal of an eleven-game season, which the Welsh and Scottish unions rejected. Discussions continued, and a format was finally agreed for the following season.

They were bottom of their pool in the Heineken Cup, failing to qualify for the knockout stage. They finished second in the Interprovincial Championship, qualifying for next season's Heineken Cup. The average crowd at Interprovincial matches was 7,000, comparing favourably to 3,000 in the English first division. Tyrone Howe was Ulster's Player of the Year, and was selected for the 2001 British & Irish Lions tour to Australia.

Player transfers

Players in
  Clem Boyd from Bath
  John Campbell
  Ryan Constable from Saracens
  Brad Free from Bective Rangers
  Grant Henderson
  Russell Nelson from Blue Bulls
  Shane Stewart from Ballymena

Players out
 Simon Mason to Stade Francais
 Eric Miller to Leinster
 Spencer Bromley to Worcester
 Riaz Fredericks (released)
 Joeli Veitayaki (released)

Squad

2000–01 Heineken Cup

2000-01 IRFU Interprovincial Championship

Top three teams qualify for next season's Heineken Cup.

Ulster Rugby Awards
The Ulster Rugby Awards ceremony was held on 24 May 2001. Winners were:

Ulster Rugby player of the year: Tyrone Howe
Supporters' Club player of the year: Tyrone Howe
Guinness personality of the year: Gary Longwell
Coach of the year: Willie Anderson, Dungannon RFC
Schools player of the year: Glen Telford, RBAI
Youth player of the year: Wayne Dougan, Banbridge RFC
Club of the year: Clogher Valley
PRO Award: Terry Jackson, Dungannon RFC
Dorrington B Faulkner Memorial Award: Roy McGarvey, Coleraine

References

2000-01
2000–01 in Irish rugby union
2000–01 Heineken Cup